Toshiko Takaezu (June 17, 1922 – March 9, 2011) was an American ceramic artist, painter, sculptor, and educator who was known for her rounded, closed forms that viewed ceramics as a fine art and more than a functional vessel. She is of Japanese descent and from Pepeeko, Hawaii.

Early life and education
Takaezu was born to Japanese immigrant parents in Pepeekeo, Hawaii, on 17 June 1922. She moved to Honolulu in 1940, where she worked at the Hawaii Potter's Guild creating identical pieces from press molds. While she hated creating hundreds of identical pieces, she appreciated that she could practice glazing.

Takaezu attended Saturday classes at the Honolulu Museum of Art School (1947 to 1949) and attended the University of Hawaiʻi (1948, and 1951) where she studied under Claude Horan. From 1951 to 1954, she continued her studies at Cranbrook Academy of Art in Bloomfield Hills, Michigan (1951), where she met Finnish ceramist Maija Grotell, who became her mentor. Takaezu earned an award after her first year of study, which acknowledged her as an outstanding student in the clay department.

Career 

In 1955, Takaezu traveled to Japan, where she studied Zen Buddhism, tea ceremony, and the techniques of traditional Japanese pottery, which influenced her work. While studying in Japan, she worked with Kaneshige Toyo and visited Shoji Hamada, both influential Japanese potters.

She taught at several universities and art schools: Cranbrook Academy of Art, Bloomfield Hills, Michigan; University of Wisconsin, Madison, Wisconsin; Cleveland Institute of Art, Cleveland, Ohio (10 years); Honolulu Academy of Art, Honolulu, Hawaii; and Princeton University, Princeton, New Jersey (1967–1992), where she was awarded an honorary doctorate.

She retired in 1992 to become a studio artist, living and working in the Quakertown section of Franklin Township, Hunterdon County, New Jersey, about 30 miles northwest of Princeton. In addition to her studio in New Jersey, she made many of her larger sculptures at Skidmore College in Saratoga Springs, New York.

Takaezu made functional wheel-thrown vessels early in her career. Later she switched to abstract sculptures with freely applied poured and painted glazes. In the early 1970s, when she didn't have access to a kiln, she painted on canvas.

Work
Takaezu treated life with a sense of wholesomeness and oneness with nature; everything she did was to improve and discover herself. She believed that ceramics involved self-revelation, once commenting, "In my life I see no difference between making pots, cooking and growing vegetables... there is need for me to work in clay... it gives me answers for my life." When she developed her signature “closed form” after sealing her pots, she found her identity as an artist. The ceramic forms resembled human hearts and torsos, closed cylindrical forms, and huge spheres she called “moons.” Before closing the forms, she dropped a bead of clay wrapped in paper inside, so that the pieces would rattle when moved.

She was once asked by Chobyo Yara what the most important part of her ceramic pieces is. She replied that, it is the hollow space of air within, because it cannot be seen but is still part of the pot. She relates this to the idea that what's inside a person is the most important.

Death and legacy
Takaezu died on March 9, 2011, in Honolulu, following a stroke she suffered in May 2010. The Toshiko Takaezu Foundation was established in 2015 to support and promote her legacy.

Exhibitions
 1955: University of Wisconsin, Madison, Wisconsin 
 1959, 1961: Cleveland Institute of Art, Cleveland, Ohio
 1961: Peabody College for Teachers, Nashville, Tennessee
 1965: Gallery 100, Princeton, New Jersey 
 1971: Lewis and Clark College, Portland, Oregon
 1975, 1985: Florida Junior College, Jacksonville, Florida 
 1987: Hale Pulamamau, Kuakini Hospital, Honolulu, Hawaii 
 1989: Montclair Art Museum, Montclair, New Jersey 
 1989: University of Bridgeport, Bridgeport, Connecticut
 2006: Hunterdon Art Museum, Clinton, New Jersey

She has also been in several group exhibitions throughout the United States and internationally in countries including Belgium, Czechoslovakia, Japan, and Switzerland.

Honors and awards
Takaezu won many honors and awards for her work: 
1952: McInerny Foundation grant 
1964: Tiffany Foundation grant 
1980: National Endowment for the Arts fellowship 
1983: Dickinson College Arts Award
1987: Living Treasure Award (Honolulu, HI)

Collections
Takaezu's work may be found in private and corporate permanent collections, as well as several public collections across the United States:

Takaezu's work may also be found in the National Museum in Bangkok, Thailand.

Notes

Further reading
Clarke, Joan and Diane Dods, Artists/Hawaii, Honolulu, University of Hawaiʻi Press, 1996, pages 98-103.
Department of Education, State of Hawaii, Artists of Hawaii, Honolulu, Department of Education, State of Hawaii, 1985, pages 55–60.
Haar, Francis and Murray Turnbull, Artists of Hawaii, Volume Two, University of Hawaiʻi Press, Honolulu, Hawaii, 1977, pages 79–84.
Nemmers, Peyton, Steuber. "In Memory of Toshiko Takaezu: Artist, Mentor, Friend"  Ceramic Arts and Technical, volume 87. 2012.
Honolulu Academy of Arts, Toshiko Takaezu, Honolulu, Hawaii, Honolulu Academy of Arts, 1993.
Honolulu Museum of Art, Spalding House Self-guided Tour, Sculpture Garden, 2014, pages 5 & 18
International Art Society of Hawai'i, Kuilima Kākou, Hawai’i-Japan Joint Exhibition, Honolulu, International Art Society of Hawai'i, 2004, page 45
Morse, Marcia, Legacy: Facets of Island Modernism, Honolulu, Honolulu Academy of Arts, 2001, pages 24, 82-87
Morse, Marcia and Allison Wong, 10 Years: The Contemporary Museum at First Hawaiian Center, The Contemporary Museum, Honolulu, 2006, page 111
Takaezu, Toshiko, Portfolio in Bamboo Ridge: Journal of Hawai'i Literature and Arts, Spring, 1996, pages 26–30.
Takaezu, Toshiko, Toshiko Takaezu, Four decades, Montclair, New Jersey, Montclair Art Museum, 1989.
Woolfolk, Ann, "Toshiko Takaezu," Princeton Alumni Weekly, Volume 83(5), 6 October 1982, pages 31–33.
Yake, J. Stanley, Toshiko Takaezu, The earth in bloom, Albany, New York, MEAM Pub. Co., 2005.
Yoshihara, Lisa A., Collective Visions, 1967-1997, Hawaii State Foundation on Culture and the Arts, Honolulu, Hawaii, 1997, page 61.

External links
Toshiko Takaezu Foundation
Toshiko Takaezu group on Facebook
Essay about Takaezu by Tony Ferguson
Grounds for Sculpture
Chautauqua Institution
ArtCyclopedia
Public television documentary featuring Toshiko Takaezu, 1993
Oral history interview with Toshiko Takaezu, 2003 June 16, Archives of American Art, Smithsonian Institution

1922 births
2011 deaths
20th-century American women artists
20th-century American painters
20th-century American sculptors
21st-century American women
American artists of Japanese descent
American potters
American women ceramists
American women painters
Ceramists from Hawaii
Cleveland Institute of Art faculty
Cranbrook Academy of Art alumni
Modern sculptors
People from Franklin Township, Hunterdon County, New Jersey
People from Hawaii (island)
Princeton University faculty
University of Hawaiʻi at Mānoa alumni
Women potters
Painters from Hawaii
Sculptors from Hawaii
American women academics